Opalomonadea is a class of biciliate phagotrophic opalozoans with an anterior hairy cilium, often from anaerobic habitats. It is a monophyletic group previously known as clade MAST-12, sister to Opalinata. This group was discovered through marine environmental DNA samples; no species have yet been described or cultured.

Phylogeny
The cladogram below shows the relationships between Opalomonadea and the rest of Opalozoans.

References

Placidozoa